The Kapawe'no First Nation is a band government in Alberta, Canada.  It is headquartered at Grouard, Alberta, which is near High Prairie.

Indian Reserves
Six Indian reserves are governed by the band:

References

First Nations governments in Alberta
Cree governments
Northern Alberta